Aesia is a genus of tachinid flies in the family Tachinidae.

Species
Aesia acerbiana Richter, 2011

Distribution
Siberia.

References

Exoristinae
Diptera of Asia
Tachinidae genera